Assonet Bay is a lake in Assonet, a village within the town of Freetown, Massachusetts. The Assonet River connects the waters of the bay with the Taunton River.

References

External links
Assonet Bay Shores Association

Taunton River watershed
Bodies of water of Bristol County, Massachusetts
Bays of Massachusetts
Freetown, Massachusetts